During the 1991–92 English football season, Sheffield United F.C. competed in the Football League First Division.

Season summary
In the 1991–92 season, the Blades had a poor start to the season and were bottom of the table at the beginning of November with just 2 wins in their first 15 league games and were destined for relegation but from mid-January, Bassett's team went on an impressive run, losing only 2 of their next 15 league games, picking up 34 points from the possible 45 during that run which saw them rise from being relegation candidates to an impressive 9th-place finish. Their highlight of the season was doing the double over their rivals Sheffield Wednesday, who finished 3rd that season.

Final league table

Results
Sheffield United's score comes first

Legend

Football League First Division

FA Cup

League Cup

Full Members Cup

Squad

Transfers

In

Out

Transfers in:  £1,445,000
Transfers out:  £1,500,000
Total spending:  £55,000

References

Sheffield United F.C. seasons
Sheffield United